The 2011 WNBA season was the 15th season of the Women's National Basketball Association. The regular season began on June 3 with the Los Angeles Sparks hosting the Minnesota Lynx, featuring 2011 WNBA Draft top pick Maya Moore, in a game televised on NBA TV. Four games followed the next day, with the marquee matchup, televised on ABC, featuring the defending champion Seattle Storm and the Phoenix Mercury in Seattle.

The Minnesota Lynx finished the regular season with the best record in the league at 27-7, and were the top seed in the Western Conference. The  Indiana Fever were the top seed in the Eastern Conference. The Lynx ultimately advanced to face the Atlanta Dream in the 2011 WNBA Finals.

2010/2011 WNBA offseason
The new television deal with ESPN continued during the 2011 season (runs 2009–2016). For the first time ever, teams will be paid rights fees as part of this deal.
As of the 2009 season, the maximum roster size per team was reduced from 13 to 11. Any team that falls below nine players able to play due to injury, pregnancy or any other factor outside of the control of the team will, upon request, be granted a roster hardship exception allowing the team to sign an additional player or players so that the team will have nine players able to play in an upcoming game or games. As soon as the injured (or otherwise sidelined) player(s) is able to play, the roster hardship player(s) – not any other player on the roster—must be waived.
On October 12, 2010, the New York Liberty named former Monarchs coach John Whisenant head coach and general manager.
On October 29, 2010, Pokey Chatman was named head coach and general manager of the Chicago Sky.
On November 1, 2010, the Washington Mystics announced that Julie Plank (head coach) and Angela Taylor (GM) would not be returning to the team and that Trudi Lacey would take over head coach and GM positions.
On December 3, 2010, Donna Orender, six-year league president, announced her resignation effective December 31.
On January 11, 2011, The San Antonio Silver Stars announced that Dan Hughes would resume head coaching duties.
The Washington Mystics announced a marquee sponsorship with Inova Health System on April 7, 2011. This marked the fifth team in the league to allow a sponsor to brand their uniforms.
On draft day, Adidas introduced the Revolution 30 technology, to be used on all WNBA team uniforms. The uniforms are 30% lighter than before and also enable moisture management. Unlike their NBA and NBA D-League counterparts, however, all WNBA uniforms underwent complete redesigns. 
NBA Commissioner David Stern announced on April 21, 2011 that Laurel J. Richie would assume role as president of the WNBA on May 16.
The New York Liberty will play home games for the next three seasons at Prudential Center in Newark, New Jersey, due to summer renovations at Madison Square Garden.

Marquee sponsorship
On August 22, 2011, the WNBA announced a league-wide marquee sponsorship with Boost Mobile. The deal would allow the Boost Mobile logo to be placed on ten of the 12 teams' jerseys (excluding Phoenix and San Antonio) in addition to branding on the courts and in arenas. A source said the deal is worth "roughly $10 million over its four years" and is the richest in league history.

2011 WNBA Draft

The WNBA Draft lottery was held on November 2, 2010. The lottery teams were the Tulsa Shock, Minnesota Lynx, Chicago Sky and Minnesota Lynx (from Conn.). The top pick was awarded to Minnesota.

The 2011 WNBA Draft was held on April 11, 2011, in Bristol, Connecticut. Coverage of the first round was shown on ESPN (HD). Second and third round coverage was shown on ESPNU and NBA TV.

The top picks were:
Maya Moore, Minnesota Lynx
Elizabeth Cambage, Tulsa Shock
Courtney Vandersloot, Chicago Sky
Amber Harris, Minnesota Lynx (from Conn.)

Regular season

Standings

All-Star Game

The 2011 WNBA All-Star Game was hosted by the San Antonio Silver Stars on July 23 at the AT&T Center. Coverage of the game began at 3:30pm (ET) on ABC. This marks the first time the Silver Stars have hosted the annual event. This is only the second time in league history that the showcase was played on the court of a Western Conference team.

Statistic leaders
The following shows the leaders for each statistic during the 2011 regular season.

Schedule

|-
| rowspan=1|Thu 19 || 7:00 || China || @ || Connecticut ||  || 101-63CON || Yuan (17) || Charles (10) || BanbanMontgomery (6) || Mohegan Sun Arena  4,666
|-
| rowspan=1|Mon 23 || 12:30 || China || @ || Chicago ||  || 84-45CHI || Fowles (18) || Song (9) || Vandersloot (7) || Trinity International University  972
|-
| rowspan=2|Tue 24 || 1:00 || Indiana || @ || Minnesota ||  || 71-66MIN || BrunsonDouglas (11) || Harris (10) || January (7) || Concordia University  2,055
|-
| 10:00 || Japan || @ || Phoenix ||  || 96-52PHO || Gray-Lawson (16) || Dupree (8) || Gray-Lawson (6) || US Airways Center  2,969
|-
| rowspan=3|Wed 25 || 10:30am || Washington || @ || New York ||  || 60-57WAS || Anosike (14) || Melvin (6) || Miller (5) || Prudential Center  6,472
|-
| 3:00 || Seattle || @ || Los Angeles ||  || 71-66LAS || Parker (17) || 3 players (6) || Wright (7) || Torodome  3,212
|-
| 7:00 || San Antonio || @ || Connecticut ||  || 80-56SAN || White (15) || Charles (17) || Hammon (6) || Mohegan Sun Arena  4,801
|-
| rowspan=1|Thu 26 || 11:30am || Chicago || @ || Washington ||  || 66-55WAS || Langhorne (15) || Langhorne (9) || Prince (4) || Verizon Center  9,502
|-
| rowspan=2|Fri 27 || 7:00 || China || @ || New York ||  || 79-65NYL || Pondexter || Breland || N/A || Times Union Center  N/A
|-
| 7:00 || San Antonio || @ || Connecticut ||  || 75-73CON || Charles (17) || Charles (11) || Robinson (6) || Mohegan Sun Arena at Casey Plaza  2,139
|-
| rowspan=1|Sat 28 || 9:00 || Phoenix || @ || Los Angeles ||  || 83-72LAS || Milton-Jones (14) || BraxtonMilton-Jones (6) || LavenderPenicheiro (4) || The Pit  N/A
|-
| rowspan=2|Sun 29 || 12:00 || Atlanta || @ || Great Britain || NBA TV || 82-51ATL || Miller (21) || Irvin (8) || Harding (5) || Manchester Evening News Arena  N/A
|-
| 5:00 || Tulsa || @ || Seattle ||  || 76-70SEA || Holt (25) || CambageJackson (8) || Bird (8) || KeyArena  4,979
|-
| rowspan=1|Tue 31 || 7:00 || Minnesota || @ || Indiana ||  || 76-70MIN || Douglas (15) || McWilliams-Franklin (8) || Wiggins (4) || Conseco Fieldhouse  3,817
|-

|-
!style="background:#094480; color:white"| 2011 WNBA regular season
|-

|-
| rowspan=1|Fri 3 || 11:00 || Minnesota || @ || Los Angeles || NBA TVPRIME || 82-74LAS || Moore (21) || Brunson (12) || Whalen (5) || Staples Center  13,589
|-
| rowspan=4|Sat 4 || 3:00 || Phoenix || @ || Seattle || ABC || 78-71SEA || Taurasi (31) || BraxtonDupreeLittle (9) || Bird (10) || KeyArena  11,548 
|-
| 7:00 || Washington || @ || Connecticut || || 89-73CON || Charles (18) || AnosikeJones (7) || AjavonLawsonMiller (4) || Mohegan Sun Arena  6,666
|-
| 7:00 || Chicago || @ || Indiana || CN100FS-I || 65-57IND || Prince (20) || Catchings (9) || Vandersloot (7) || Conseco Fieldhouse  8,024
|-
| 8:00 || Tulsa || @ || San Antonio || COX || 93-73SAN || Young (20) || Cambage (10) || HammonHodgesRobinson (5) || AT&T Center  12,406
|- 
| rowspan=2|Sun 5 || 3:00 || New York || @ || Atlanta || SSO || 94-88 (OT)NYL || Pierson (25) || Lyttle (11) || Pondexter (11) || Philips Arena  8,038
|-
| 3:30 || Los Angeles || @ || Minnesota || PRIMEFS-N || 86-69MIN || Augustus (17) || Brunson (15) || Whalen (7) || Target Center  10,123
|-
| rowspan=1|Tue 7 || 8:00 || Tulsa || @ || Minnesota || || 75-65MIN || Brunson (17) || BrunsonCambage (15) || Whalen (4) || Target Center  7,713
|-
| rowspan=2|Thu 9 || 7:00 || Washington || @ || Atlanta || ESPN2 || 98-90 (OT)WAS || Langhorne (30) || de Souza (15) || Castro MarquesK. Miller (5) || Philips Arena  5,020
|-
| 10:00 || Minnesota || @ || Seattle ||  || 81-74MIN || Bird (24) || Brunson (15) || Whalen (10) || KeyArena  6,291
|-
| rowspan=4|Fri 10 || 7:00 || New York || @ || Indiana ||  || 81-80NYL || Douglas (27) || Vaughn (9) || Powell (4) || Conseco Fieldhouse  7,703
|-
| 8:00 || San Antonio || @ || Tulsa ||  || 93-62SAN || Hodges (19) || Phillips (8) || Hammon (5) || BOK Center  7,509
|-
| 8:30 || Connecticut || @ || Chicago || CN100 || 78-75CHI || Fowles (23) || Fowles (13) || Prince (7) || Allstate Arena  6,609
|-
| 10:30 || Phoenix || @ || Los Angeles ||  || 98-84LAS || Parker (22) || Dupree (11) || Johnson (6) || Staples Center  10,616
|-
| rowspan=3|Sat 11 || 7:00 || Indiana || @ || New York || MSG || 86-80IND || Carson (23) || Davenport (8) || Powell (5) || Prudential Center  7,835
|-
| 7:00 || Chicago || @ || Washington || CN100 || 84-77CHI || Ajavon (24) || Snow (8) || Canty (6) || Verizon Center  11,943
|-
| 8:00 || Atlanta || @ || San Antonio ||  || 86-74SAN || Adams (32) || de Souza (14) || Hammon (8) || AT&T Center  9,140
|-
| rowspan=1|Sun 12 || 3:00 || Tulsa || @ || Connecticut || || 90-79CON || Latta (26) || Charles (8) || Montgomery (7) || Mohegan Sun Arena  6,520
|-
| rowspan=2|Tue 14 || 7:00 || Atlanta || @ || New York ||  || 79-58ATL || Carson (21) || Carson (8) || Lehning (6) || Prudential Center  5,725
|-
| 7:00 || Tulsa || @ || Indiana || ESPN2 || 82-74IND || Douglas (22) || Jackson (11) || January (10) || Conseco Fieldhouse  6,024
|-
| rowspan=1|Thu 16 || 7:00 || Connecticut || @ || Washington || CSN-MA || 79-71CON || Charles (26) || Anosike (13) || MillerMontgomery (5) || Verizon Center  7,028
|-
| rowspan=4|Fri 17 || 8:00 || Atlanta || @ || Minnesota ||  || 96-85MIN || McCoughtry (27) || Brunson (14) || Whalen (8) || Target Center  7,556
|-
| 8:30 || New York || @ || Chicago || CN100 || 85-73CHI || Fowles (27) || Fowles (11) || Prince (8) || Allstate Arena  5,718
|-
| 10:00 || San Antonio || @ || Phoenix || FS-A || 101-99SAN || Young (26) || Dupree (12) || Taylor (10) || US Airways Center  12,274
|-
| 10:00 || Indiana || @ || Seattle ||  || 68-54SEA || Cash (14) || Catchings (14) || Cash (5) || KeyArena  8,178
|-
| rowspan=1|Sat 18 || 8:00 || Washington || @ || Tulsa || || 77-59TUL || Latta (22) || Langhorne (12) || Pedersen (7) || BOK Center  4,423
|-
| rowspan=4|Sun 19 || 1:00 || Chicago || @ || Connecticut ||  || 83-68CON || Charles (31) || CharlesFowles (12) || Vandersloot (6) || Mohegan Sun Arena  6,875
|-
| 3:00 || Minnesota || @ || Atlanta || SSO || 77-64MIN || Augustus (19) || de SouzaMcWilliams-Franklin (12) || MooreWhalen (5) || Philips Arena  7,274
|-
| 6:00 || Indiana || @ || Phoenix ||  || 93-89 (OT)PHO || Taurasi (32) || Dupree (18) || BobbittJanuaryTaylor (6) || US Airways Center  7,701
|-
| 8:30 || Seattle || @ || Los Angeles || PRIME || 74-50LAS || Bird (15) || Little (8) || Toliver (5) || Staples Center  9,119
|-
| rowspan=5|Tue 21 || 12:00 || Chicago || @ || Atlanta || SSO || 71-68ATL || Fowles (21) || Snow (12) || HardingVandersloot (6) || Philips Arena  6,154
|-
| 7:00 || Indiana || @ || Washington || CSN-MA || 89-80IND || Langhorne (23) || Langhorne (9) || January (9) || Verizon Center  7,980
|-
| 8:00 || Phoenix || @ || San Antonio || ESPN2 || 105-98PHO || Taylor (30) || Dupree (13) || HammonD. Robinson (7) || AT&T Center  7,072
|-
| 8:00 || Seattle || @ || Tulsa ||  || 82-77SEA || Bird (21) || T. Jackson (10) || Bird (6) || BOK Center  4,612
|-
| 10:00 || New York || @ || Los Angeles || ESPN2 || 96-91LAS || Milton-Jones (27) || Parker (13) || Toliver (7) || Staples Center  10,389
|-
| rowspan=2|Thu 23 || 12:30 || New York || @ || Tulsa ||  || 94-82NYL || Vaughn (24) || Vaughn (12) || Pondexter (10) || BOK Center  4,682
|-
| 8:00 || Connecticut || @ || Chicago || CN100 || 107-101 (2OT)CHI || Montgomery (33) || Snow (17) || Vandersloot (10) || Allstate Arena  3,319
|-
| rowspan=3|Fri 24 || 7:30 || Phoenix || @ || Atlanta || FS-AFS-S || 92-83PHO || McCoughtry (24) || Taylor (10) || Taylor (8) || Philips Arena  5,492
|-
| 8:00 || Los Angeles || @ || San Antonio ||  || 90-80 (OT)SAN || Perkins (31) || Parker (13) || Hammon (9) || AT&T Center  8,617
|-
| 10:00 || Minnesota || @ || Seattle || KONG || 65-55SEA || Augustus (17) || Cash (9) || Bird (8) || KeyArena  7,914
|-
| rowspan=2|Sat 25 || 7:00 || Connecticut || @ || Indiana || NBA TVCSN-NE || 75-70IND || Montgomery (19) || Catchings (12) || Montgomery (6) || Conseco Fieldhouse  7,100
|-
| 8:00 || Phoenix || @ || Chicago || CN100 || 86-78PHO || Fowles (28) || Fowles (11) || Taylor (7) || Allstate Arena  5,547
|-
| rowspan=4|Sun 26 || 3:00 || San Antonio || @ || Atlanta || NBA TVSSO || 92-86SAN || Perkins (25) || Paris (11) || Hammon (6) || Philips Arena  5,718
|-
| 4:00 || Los Angeles || @ || New York ||  || 77-67NYL || Pondexter (22) || Parker (11) || Pondexter (5) || Prudential Center  7,625
|-
| 4:00 || Tulsa || @ || Washington || CSN-MA || 83-63WAS || Langhorne (23) || Coleman (12) || Ajavon (6) || Verizon Center  10,675
|-
| 7:00 || Indiana || @ || Minnesota || NBA TVFS-N || 78-75IND || Douglas (22) || Brunson (11) || JanuaryWhalen (4) || Target Center  7,117
|-
| rowspan=3|Tue 28 || 7:00 || Phoenix || @ || Indiana ||  || 91-86IND || Douglas (26) || Braxton (7) || Catchings (7) || Conseco Fieldhouse  6,625
|-
| 8:00 || Los Angeles || @ || Connecticut || ESPN2 || 79-76CON || Charles (22) || Charles (23) || 4 players (5) || Mohegan Sun Arena  6,515
|-
| 8:00 || San Antonio || @ || Chicago || CN100 || 84-74SAN || PrinceYoung (19) || Fowles (12) || Hammon (5) || Allstate Arena  3,894
|-
| rowspan=2|Thu 30 || 7:30 || New York || @ || Atlanta || SSO || 87-81ATL || de Souza (27) || de Souza (15) || Pondexter (5) || Philips Arena  4,423
|-
| 8:00 || Minnesota || @ || Tulsa ||  || 101-71MIN || Whalen (21) || McWilliams-Franklin (9) || PedersenWhalen (5) || BOK Center  3,970
|-

|-
| rowspan=3|Fri 1 || 7:00 || San Antonio || @ || New York || NBA TV || 81-75NYL || AdamsPondexter (19) || Young (8) || HammonPondexter (5) || Prudential Center  6,714
|-
| 7:30 || Seattle || @ || Connecticut || CSN-NE || 75-70CON || Cash (25) || Charles (10) || Montgomery (8) || Mohegan Sun Arena  7,748
|-
| 10:00 || Chicago || @ || Phoenix || NBA TVCN100 || 94-84PHO || Taurasi (24) || Dupree (9) || PrinceTaurasi (6) || US Airways Center  9,517
|-
| rowspan=1|Sun 3 || 4:00 || Seattle || @ || Washington || NBA TVCSN-MA || 73-63SEA || CashDunlap (19) || Anosike (10) || Bird (5) || Verizon Center  11,604
|-
| rowspan=3|Tue 5 || 7:00 || Seattle || @ || Indiana || FS-I || 78-61IND || Davenport (15) || Anosike (10) || Phillips (6) || Conseco Fieldhouse  6,525
|-
| 8:00 || Washington || @ || Chicago || CN100 || 78-65CHI || Fowles (34) || Fowles (16) || ThomasThorn (4) || Allstate Arena  3,187
|-
| 9:00 || Los Angeles || @ || Phoenix || ESPN2 || 101-82PHO || Hoffman (21) || Pringle (9) || Taurasi (7) || US Airways Center  9,825
|-
| rowspan=2|Fri 8 || 8:00 || New York || @ || San Antonio || NBA TV || 76-73NYL || Pondexter (20) || Pierson (10) || Pondexter (7) || AT&T Center  8,100
|-
| 8:00 || Phoenix || @ || Tulsa ||  || 86-78PHO || Cambage (19) || Bonner (13) || Lewis (9) || BOK Center  4,081
|-
| rowspan=4|Sat 9 || 7:00 || Washington || @ || Indiana ||  || 68-57IND || Phillips (14) || Coleman (9) || CatchingsMiller (4) || Conseco Fieldhouse  7,056
|-
| 8:00 || Connecticut || @ || Minnesota || NBA TVFS-N || 90-67MIN || Moore (26) || BrunsonMcWilliams-Franklin (10) || Whalen (8) || Target Center  8,205
|-
| 8:00 || Atlanta || @ || Chicago || CN100 || 81-69CHI || Prince (24) || Fowles (12) || Vandersloot (9) || Allstate Arena  5,679
|-
| 10:00 || Los Angeles || @ || Seattle || NBA TVKONG || 99-80SEA || Cash (26) || Lavender (9) || Bird (8) || KeyArena  9,686
|-
| rowspan=2|Sun 10 || 4:00 || Chicago || @ || New York || NBA TVCN100MSG+ || 80-73NYL || CarsonPondexter (18) || FowlesPowell (8) || PondexterPowell (4) || Prudential Center  7,315
|-
| 6:00 || Tulsa || @ || Phoenix || NBA TVCOX || 102-63PHO || Jackson (19) || PedersenSanford (7) || Taurasi (6) || US Airways Center  7,696
|-
| rowspan=2|Tue 12 || 3:00 || Washington || @ || Seattle || NBA TV || 79-71SEA || Bird (22) || Coleman (9) || AjavonBird (7) || KeyArena  13,384
|-
| 8:00 || Los Angeles || @ || San Antonio || NBA TVPRIMEFS-SW || 84-74LAS || Young (22) || Young (11) || Toliver (5) || AT&T Center  6,769
|-
| rowspan=4|Wed 13 || 12:00 || Atlanta || @ || New York ||  || 91-69NYL || Powell (20) || de SouzaPowell (7) || CarsonMitchellPondexter (5) || Prudential Center  14,314
|-
| 12:30 || Tulsa || @ || Chicago ||  || 72-54CHI || Fowles (21) || Fowles (13) || Prince (6) || Allstate Arena  13,838
|-
| 1:00 || Phoenix || @ || Minnesota || NBA TVFS-AFS-N || 112-105PHO || Taurasi (27) || Brunson (16) || JohnsonTaurasiTaylor (8) || Target Center  11,820
|-
| 1:00 || Connecticut || @ || Indiana ||  || 90-78IND || Douglas (20) || Charles (11) || Catchings (7) || Conseco Fieldhouse  9,045
|-
| rowspan=1|Thu 14 || 9:00 || Seattle || @ || San Antonio || ESPN2 || 69-66SAN || Adams (23) || RobinsonWillingham (7) || Hammon (9) || AT&T Center  9,167
|-
| rowspan=4|Fri 15 || 7:00 || Connecticut || @ || New York || NBA TVCSN-NE || 68-59CON || CharlesVaughn (15) || Vaughn (9) || MitchellMontgomery (4) || Prudential Center  7,722
|-
| 7:00 || Minnesota || @ || Indiana ||  || 80-70MIN || Catchings (22) || McWilliams-Franklin (9) || Whalen (7) || Conseco Fieldhouse  7,538
|-
| 8:00 || Los Angeles || @ || Tulsa ||  || 79-74LAS || Toliver (25) || Jackson (10) || Toliver (6) || BOK Center  5,034
|-
| 10:00 || Washington || @ || Phoenix || NBA TVFS-A || 78-64PHO || Dupree (20) || Anosike (10) || Taylor (7) || US Airways Center  9,075
|-
| rowspan=2|Sat 16 || 7:30 || Chicago || @ || Atlanta || NBA TVCN100FS-S || 76-68ATL || McCoughtry (24) || Snow (12) || Price (10) || Philips Arena  7,413
|-
| 8:00 || Seattle || @ || Minnesota ||  || 69-62MIN || Augustus (19) || CashMoore (9) || McWilliams-FranklinSmith (4) || Target Center  7,733
|-
| rowspan=3|Sun 17 || 4:00 || Tulsa || @ || New York || NBA TVMSG+ || 88-57NYL || Pondexter (18) || Jackson (11) || Holt (4) || Prudential Center  6,735
|-
| 5:00 || Indiana || @ || Connecticut ||  || 76-71CON || McCray (22) || Catchings (15) || Montgomery (7) || Mohegan Sun Arena  7,075
|-
| 8:30 || Washington || @ || Los Angeles || NBA TV || 89-85 (OT)WAS || Ajavon (29) || Langhorne (14) || Toliver (7) || Staples Center  10,398
|-
| rowspan=1|Mon 18 || 10:30 || San Antonio || @ || Los Angeles ||  || 79-69SAN || Hammon (26) || O'Hea (11) || Lacy (7) || Staples Center  8,818
|-
| rowspan=3|Tue 19 || 12:00 || Indiana || @ || Atlanta || NBA TVSSO || 84-74ATL || Catchings (22) || de Souza (11) || Catchings (6) || Philips Arena  7,645
|-
| 7:00 || Seattle || @ || Chicago || ESPN2 || 78-69CHI || Bird (26) || Robinson (10) || Vandersloot (7) || Allstate Arena  6,026
|-
| 7:30 || New York || @ || Connecticut ||  || 85-79CON || Charles (24) || Powell (11) || Montgomery (10) || Mohegan Sun Arena  6,096
|-
| rowspan=2|Wed 20 || 11:30am || Atlanta || @ || Washington || NBA TV || 86-79ATL || McCoughtry (33) || Anosike (14) || K. Miller (6) || Verizon Center  13,954
|-
| 3:30 || Minnesota || @ || Phoenix || NBA TVFS-A || 106-98MIN || Augustus (25) || BonnerDupree (7) || Whalen (8) || US Airways Center  12,118
|-
| rowspan=2|Thu 21 || 7:00 || Chicago || @ || Indiana || NBA TVCN100FS-I || 77-63IND || Fowles (21) || CatchingsDavenportDouglas (7) || Douglas (7) || Conseco Fieldhouse  8,050
|-
| 10:00 || San Antonio || @ || Seattle || NBA TVFS-SW || 73-55SEA || Wright (17) || CashRobinson (9) || Bird (7) || KeyArena  6,922
|-
| rowspan=1 style="background:#FAFAD2"|Sat 23 ||style="background:#FAFAD2"| 3:30 ||style="background:#FAFAD2"| East ||style="background:#FAFAD2"| @ ||style="background:#FAFAD2"| West ||style="background:#FAFAD2"| ABC ||style="background:#FAFAD2"|118-113EAST ||style="background:#FAFAD2"|Cash (21)  ||style="background:#FAFAD2"|Cash (12)  ||style="background:#FAFAD2"|PondexterTaurasi (7)  ||style="background:#FAFAD2"| AT&T Center  12,540
|-
| rowspan=5|Tue 26 || 7:00 || San Antonio || @ || Washington || CSN-MA || 73-67SAN || Hammon (22) || Appel (12) || Thomas (5) || Verizon Center  11,331
|-
| 8:00 || Atlanta || @ || Tulsa ||  || 76-68ATL || McCoughtry (37) || Jackson (17) || 5 players (3) || BOK Center  3,435
|-
| 8:00 || Los Angeles || @ || Minnesota ||  || 85-72MIN || Toliver (28) || HoffmanMcWilliams-Franklin (9) || Whalen (7) || Target Center  8,044
|-
| 8:00 || Connecticut || @ || Chicago || CSN-NECN100 || 77-66CON || Jones (22) || Charles (15) || Montgomery (6) || Allstate Arena  3,091
|-
| 10:00 || Seattle || @ || Phoenix || NBA TV || 83-77SEA || Taurasi (26) || Cash (8) || Bird (7) || US Airways Center  6,108
|-
| rowspan=5|Thu 28 || 12:30 || Phoenix || @ || San Antonio || NBA TVFS-AFS-SW || 102-91SAN || Hammon (33) || Dupree (14) || D. Robinson (8) || AT&T Center  14,797
|-
| 7:00 || Washington || @ || New York || MSG || 75-71NYL || Pondexter (19) || Langhorne (9) || PiersonPondexter (4) || Prudential Center  6,808
|-
| 7:00 || Los Angeles || @ || Atlanta || NBA TVSSO || 89-80ATL || McCoughtry (22) || McCoughtry (11) || Penicheiro (11) || Philips Arena  6,701
|-
| 7:30 || Indiana || @ || Connecticut ||  || 69-58IND || Catchings (16) || CharlesDavenport (10) || Bobbitt (5) || Mohegan Sun Arena  6,329
|-
| 8:00 || Chicago || @ || Tulsa ||  || 64-55CHI || Latta (20) || Jackson (15) || HoltSnow (5) || BOK Center  4,012
|-
| rowspan=2|Fri 29 || 7:00 || Indiana || @ || Washington || NBA TVCSN-MA || 61-59IND || Ajavon (19) || Walker (10) || Catchings (5) || Verizon Center  11,587
|-
| 8:00 || Seattle || @ || Minnesota ||  || 92-67MIN || Cash (18) || Kobryn (9) || Moore (6) || Target Center  7,856
|-
| rowspan=3|Sat 30 || 7:00 || Phoenix || @ || New York || NBA TVMSG+ || 91-84PHO || Taylor (29) || Vaughn (10) || Swanier (7) || Prudential Center  7,214
|-
| 8:00 || Seattle || @ || Tulsa ||  || 89-72SEA || Bird (29) || Cash (9) || Bird (7) || BOK Center  5,067
|-
| 8:00 || Los Angeles || @ || Chicago || CN100 || 88-84LAS || Milton-Jones (19) || Fowles (9) || PenicheiroPrinceToliver (5) || Allstate Arena  5,909
|-
| rowspan=3|Sun 31 || 3:00 || Minnesota || @ || San Antonio || NBA TV || 70-69MIN || Whalen (23) || Brunson (13) || HammonWhalen (6) || AT&T Center  7,260
|-
| 5:00 || Atlanta || @ || Connecticut ||  || 99-92CON || McCoughtry (36) || Charles (11) || Lawson (9) || Mohegan Sun Arena  6,955
|-
| 6:00 || Los Angeles || @ || Indiana || NBA TV || 98-63IND || Davenport (16) || Catchings (11) || Catchings (6) || Conseco Fieldhouse  9,256

|- 
| rowspan=3|Tue 2 || 7:30 || New York || @ || Atlanta || FS-S || 85-75NYL || McCoughtry (24) || Pierson (8) || Harding (9) || Philips Arena  4,573
|-
| 8:00 || Phoenix || @ || Minnesota || ESPN2 || 90-73MIN || Moore (22) || McWilliams-Franklin (10) || Whalen (5) || Target Center  7,126
|-
| 10:00 || San Antonio || @ || Seattle ||  || 78-64SEA || Bird (17) || Cash (9) || Wright (7) || KeyArena  6,179
|-
| rowspan=1|Wed 3 || 3:00 || Connecticut || @ || Los Angeles || NBA TV || 79-70CON || Charles (20) || Charles (13) || Montgomery (6) || Staples Center  14,266
|-
| rowspan=2|Thu 4 || 12:00 || Chicago || @ || New York || NBA TVMSG || 59-49NYL || Pondexter (15) || Powell (10) || CarsonPondexterPrince (3) || Prudential Center  10,133
|-
| 8:00 || San Antonio || @ || Minnesota || NBA TVFS-SW || 62-60MIN || McWilliams-FranklinYoung (18) || BrunsonYoung (13) || Whalen (6) || Target Center  8,123
|-
| rowspan=2|Fri 5 || 8:00 || Indiana || @ || Tulsa ||  || 85-65IND || Davenport (17) || Jackson (8) || Phillips (4) || BOK Center  5,013
|-
| 10:00 || Connecticut || @ || Seattle || NBA TV || 81-79SEA || Bird (20) || Charles (10) || CashWright (5) || KeyArena  7,289
|-
| rowspan=2|Sat 6 || 7:00 || New York || @ || Washington || NBA TV || 91-81WAS || Ajavon (32) || AnosikeLanghorne (9) || Pondexter (7) || Verizon Center  10,741
|-
| 8:00 || Tulsa || @ || San Antonio ||  || 71-64SAN || Jackson (27) || Jackson (10) || Hammon (5) || AT&T Center  8,273
|-
| rowspan=4|Sun 7 || 3:00 || Seattle || @ || Atlanta || NBA TVSSO || 70-53ATL || McCoughtry (17) || de SouzaLyttle (7) || Harding (7) || Philips Arena  7,337
|-
| 6:00 || Connecticut || @ || Phoenix || NBA TVFS-A || 96-95 (OT)CON || Taurasi (29) || Charles (17) || GreeneTaurasi (6) || US Airways Center  8,514
|-
| 6:00 || Indiana || @ || Chicago || CN100 || 88-69CHI || FowlesMurphy (21) || Fowles (12) || Catchings (5) || Allstate Arena  5,794
|-
| 8:30 || Minnesota || @ || Los Angeles || NBA TV || 84-78MIN || Whalen (24) || AugustusBrunson (7) || Whalen (8) || Staples Center  13,528
|-
| rowspan=6|Tue 9 || 7:00 || Atlanta || @ || Washington || CSN-MA || 72-70ATL || Ajavon (28) || de Souza (12) || McCoughtry (5) || Verizon Center  9,536
|-
| 7:00 || San Antonio || @ || Indiana ||  || 81-68IND || Catchings (21) || Young (9) || Hammon (5) || Conseco Fieldhouse  7,520
|-
| 7:30 || Chicago || @ || Connecticut ||  || 69-58CON || Fowles (19) || Young (15) || LawsonWhite (4) || Mohegan Sun Arena  6,049
|-
| 8:00 || Seattle || @ || New York || ESPN2 || 58-56NYL || Pondexter (19) || Pierson (8) || Pondexter (5) || Prudential Center  6,732
|-
| 10:00 || Minnesota || @ || Phoenix ||  || 85-80PHO || Moore (28) || BrunsonDupree (11) || Whalen (6) || US Airways Center  6,726
|-
| 10:30 || Tulsa || @ || Los Angeles || PRIME || 71-66LAS || Penicheiro (23) || Hoffman (8) || Penicheiro (7) || Staples Center  8,255
|-
| rowspan=3|Thu 11 || 7:30 || San Antonio || @ || Connecticut || FS-SW || 72-59SAN || Hammon (18) || Jones (10) || Hammon (5) || Mohegan Sun Arena  5,334
|-
| 10:00 || Atlanta || @ || Phoenix ||  || 109-95PHO || BonnerMcCoughtry (25) || Bonner (13) || Taylor (6) || US Airways Center  7,940
|-
| 10:00 || Tulsa || @ || Seattle ||  || 77-63SEA || Cambage (24) || Cambage (10) || 4 players (3) || KeyArena  6,503
|-
| rowspan=3|Fri 12 || 7:00 || New York || @ || Washington ||  || 64-63WAS || LanghorneMitchell (18) || Anosike (11) || Mitchell (6) || Verizon Center  10,092
|-
| 8:30 || Minnesota || @ || Chicago || CN100 || 79-76MIN || Fowles (28) || Fowles (13) || Vandersloot (8) || Allstate Arena  6,289
|-
| 10:30 || Phoenix || @ || Los Angeles ||  || 93-90 (OT)LAS || Taylor (29) || Bonner (10) || Johnson (12) || Staples Center  10,512
|-
| rowspan=3|Sat 13 || 7:00 || Washington || @ || Connecticut ||  || 82-75CON || Langhorne (17) || White (10) || Miller (6) || Mohegan Sun Arena  6,717
|-
| 7:00 || New York || @ || Indiana || NBA TV || 82-71IND || Catchings (32) || Pondexter (8) || Pondexter (5) || Conseco Fieldhouse  9,237
|-
| 10:00 || Atlanta || @ || Seattle || NBA TVKONG || 92-63ATL || Castro MarquesMcCoughtry (17) || McCoughtryRobinson (6) || Price (4) || KeyArena  9,686
|-
| rowspan=2|Sun 14 || 3:00 || Chicago || @ || San Antonio || NBA TVCN100 || 85-73CHI || Fowles (28) || Fowles (17) || D. Robinson (7) || AT&T Center  7,060
|-
| 7:00 || Tulsa || @ || Minnesota || NBA TVCOXFS-N || 82-54MIN || Augustus (16) || Brunson (6) || Whalen (9) || Target Center  8,388
|-
| rowspan=5|Tue 16 || 7:00 || Washington || @ || New York ||  || 69-66NYL || Pondexter (26) || Vaughn (7) || AjavonPowell (5) || Prudential Center  6,223
|-
| 7:30 || Minnesota || @ || Connecticut || CSN-NE || 108-79CON || Whalen (20) || Charles (18) || Montgomery (7) || Mohegan Sun Arena  9,323
|-
| 8:00 || Indiana || @ || San Antonio ||  || 65-63IND || Catchings (24) || Young (13) || Bevilaqua (4) || AT&T Center  6,358
|-
| 10:00 || Seattle || @ || Phoenix ||  || 81-79PHO || Taurasi (24) || Cash (15) || Bird (8) || US Airways Center  8,870
|-
| 10:30 || Atlanta || @ || Los Angeles || NBA TVSSOPRIME || 84-79ATL || McCoughtry (23) || de Souza (13) || Price (8) || Staples Center  7,522
|-
| rowspan=3|Thu 18 || 7:00 || Connecticut || @ || New York || NBA TVMSG || 84-81 (OT)NYL || Charles (29) || Charles (14) || Montgomery (5) || Prudential Center  7,245
|-
| 7:00 || Minnesota || @ || Washington ||  || 81-62MIN || Augustus (18) || McWilliams-Franklin (7) || Whalen (7) || Verizon Center  9,483
|-
| 10:30 || Indiana || @ || Los Angeles ||  || 75-70LAS || Hoffman (21) || Smith (9) || CatchingsParkerPhillips (5) || Staples Center  8,102
|-
| rowspan=1|Fri 19 || 7:30 || Connecticut || @ || Atlanta || NBA TVSSO || 94-88 (OT)ATL || McCoughtry (26) || McCoughtry (12) || Montgomery (7) || Philips Arena  7,225
|-
| rowspan=4|Sat 20 || 7:00 || Chicago || @ || Washington || NBA TVCN100 || 71-70CHI || Fowles (25) || Fowles (11) || 4 players (4) || Verizon Center  10,273
|-
| 8:00 || Los Angeles || @ || Minnesota ||  || 87-68MIN || Parker (18) || McWilliams-FranklinParker (8) || Whalen (5) || Target Center  8,816
|-
| 10:00 || San Antonio || @ || Phoenix || NBA TVFS-SWFS-A || 87-81PHO || Taylor (28) || Bonner (11) || Hammon (10) || US Airways Center  10,134
|-
| 10:00 || New York || @ || Seattle ||  || 63-62SEA || Jackson (20) || CashJackson (7) || Pondexter (6) || KeyArena  7,139
|-
| rowspan=3|Sun 21 || 5:00 || Atlanta || @ || Connecticut ||  || 96-87CON || McCoughtry (22) || de SouzaJones (10) || Harding (9) || Mohegan Sun Arena  6,636
|-
| 6:00 || Washington || @ || Indiana || NBA TVFS-I || 83-51IND || Douglas (15) || Catchings (8) || Catchings (5) || Conseco Fieldhouse  7,935
|-
| 7:00 || Los Angeles || @ || Tulsa ||  || 73-67LAS || Parker (23) || Jackson (11) || Latta (6) || BOK Center  6,012
|-
| rowspan=5|Tue 23 || 7:00 || Los Angeles || @ || Washington || CSN-MA || 86-82 (OT)LAS || Langhorne (28) || Thompson (10) || Penicheiro (6) || Verizon Center  8,441
|-
| 8:00 || Minnesota || @ || Tulsa ||  || 78-72MIN || HoltMcWilliams-Franklin (18) || BrunsonJackson (10) || Latta (7) || BOK Center  3,750
|-
| 8:00 || Atlanta || @ || Chicago || CN100 || 83-80ATL || McCoughtry (22) || Fowles (12) || Harding (9) || Allstate Arena  2,876
|-
| 10:00 || New York || @ || Phoenix || ESPN2 || 74-70NYL || Pondexter (25) || Taylor (9) || Pierson (5) || US Airways Center  8,871
|-
| 10:00 || San Antonio || @ || Seattle ||  || 63-55SEA || Wright (16) || Cash (9) || BirdHammon (5) || KeyArena  6,559
|-
| rowspan=1|Thu 25 || 10:00 || Tulsa || @ || Seattle ||  || 74-57SEA || L. Jackson (14) || T. JacksonRobinson (9) || Bird (4) || KeyArena  6,887
|-
| rowspan=4|Fri 26 || 7:30 || Phoenix || @ || Connecticut || CSN-NE || 95-92CON || TaurasiTaylor (26) || DupreeJonesSanford (11) || Johnson (7) || Mohegan Sun Arena  9,007
|-
| 8:00 || San Antonio || @ || Minnesota || NBA TV || 85-75MIN || Augustus (19) || Brunson (8) || HammonWhalen (9) || Target Center  9,212
|-
| 8:30 || Washington || @ || Chicago || CN100 || 80-67CHI || Langhorne (19) || Fowles (12) || LanghorneThornVandersloot (5) || Allstate Arena  4,434
|-
| 10:30 || Tulsa || @ || Los Angeles || NBA TV || 77-75TUL || Milton-Jones (24) || Jackson (11) || Penicheiro (10) || Staples Center  8,997
|-
| rowspan=1|Sat 27|| 7:00 || Atlanta || @ || Indiana || NBA TVSSOFS-I || 86-80ATL || Catchings (22) || Lyttle (9) || Douglas (5) || Conseco Fieldhouse  9,242
|-
| rowspan=5|Sun 28 || 3:00 || Minnesota || @ || San Antonio ||  || 72-61MIN || Augustus (20) || Brunson (14) || Hammon (7) || AT&T Center  7,924
|-
| 4:00 || Connecticut || @ || Tulsa ||  || 83-72TUL || Swoopes (22) || Jackson (12) || Latta (6) || BOK Center  4,813
|-
| 4:00 || Phoenix || @ || Washington || NBA TVCSN-MA || 86-79PHO || DupreeLanghorne (27) || Langhorne (12) || Johnson (8) || Verizon Center  11,614
|-
| 6:00 || New York || @ || Chicago || NBA TVCN100 || 74-73CHI || Pierson (19) || Fowles (14) || Pondexter (8) || Allstate Arena  5,707
|-
| 9:00 || Los Angeles || @ || Seattle || ESPN2 || 65-63SEA || Parker (19) || Parker (14) || BirdPenicheiro (4) || KeyArena  9,686
|-
| rowspan=6|Tue 30 || 7:00 || Chicago || @ || New York || CN100MSG+ || 71-67NYL || Fowles (22) || FowlesPierson (8) || Thorn (4) || Prudential Center  6,334
|-
| 7:30 || Indiana || @ || Atlanta || SSO || 92-90ATL || McCoughtry (28) || Lyttle (11) || Harding (6) || Philips Arena  6,467
|-
| 8:00 || Connecticut || @ || San Antonio ||  || 78-66SAN || CharlesHammon (16) || Jones (10) || Hammon (6) || AT&T Center  6,934
|-
| 8:00 || Phoenix || @ || Tulsa ||  || 96-74PHO || Bonner (25) || BonnerSanford (9) || Latta (6) || BOK Center  3,590
|-
| 8:00 || Washington || @ || Minnesota ||  || 73-56MIN || Whalen (21) || AnosikeBrunson (7) || Whalen (5) || Target Center  8,065
|-
| 10:30 || Seattle || @ || Los Angeles || PRIME || 68-62LAS || Parker (27) || CashWright (8) || Penicheiro (5) || Staples Center  9,023
|-

|-
| rowspan=2|Thu 1 || 7:00 || Atlanta || @ || Washington ||  || 85-81WAS || McCoughtry (30) || GardinLanghorne (10) || Harding (8) || Verizon Center  7,954
|-
| 8:00 || Phoenix || @ || San Antonio ||  || 86-68SAN || BonnerPerkins (23) || Dupree (13) || D. Robinson (7) || AT&T Center  6,502
|-
| rowspan=4|Fri 2 || 7:30 || Indiana || @ || Connecticut ||  || 83-55CON || McCray (14) || Charles (16) || Charles (7) || Mohegan Sun Arena  6,991
|-
| 7:30 || Washington || @ || Atlanta || NBA TVSSO || 95-73ATL || PriceThomas (19) || LyttleWalker (8) || Harding (7) || Philips Arena  6,579
|-
| 8:00 || Seattle || @ || Tulsa ||  || 78-72SEA || Bird (21) || T. Jackson (10) || Swoopes (6) || BOK Center  6,117
|-
| 8:00 || New York || @ || Minnesota ||  || 78-62NYL || Mitchell (24) || Hollingsworth (9) || Pondexter (7) || Target Center  8,929
|-
| rowspan=2|Sat 3 || 8:00 || Seattle || @ || San Antonio || NBA TV || 70-60SEA || Young (22) || Cash (8) || D. Robinson (6) || AT&T Center  9,575
|-
| 10:00 || Los Angeles || @ || Phoenix || NBA TV || 93-77PHO || Parker (32) || Dupree (19) || Johnson (9) || US Airways Center  9,620
|-
| rowspan=4|Sun 4 || 3:00 || Tulsa || @ || Atlanta || SSO || 73-52ATL || McCoughtry (19) || Jackson (11) || Harding (10) || Philips Arena  7,661
|-
| 4:00 || Minnesota || @ || New York ||  || 86-68MIN || Moore (19) || Pierson (8) || PondexterWhalen (7) || Prudential Center  8,247
|-
| 4:00 || Connecticut || @ || Washington || NBA TVCSN-MA || 79-48CON || Charles (24) || Charles (15) || Montgomery (7) || Verizon Center  13,403
|-
| 6:00 || Indiana || @ || Chicago || NBA TVCN100 || 88-80IND || Prince (21) || Fowles (9) || CatchingsPrince (6) || Allstate Arena  6,199
|-
| rowspan=2|Tue 6 || 7:30 || Connecticut || @ || Atlanta || SSO || 85-74ATL || McCoughtry (35) || CharlesLyttle (12) || Harding (8) || Philips Arena  6,558
|-
| 10:30 || San Antonio || @ || Los Angeles || NBA TVFS-SWPRIME || 82-65SAN || Hammon (37) || AppelMilton-Jones (8) || Penicheiro (7) || Staples Center  8,502
|-
| rowspan=1|Wed 7 || 7:00 || Washington || @ || Indiana || NBA TV || 87-69IND || Douglas (21) || Langhorne (15) || Douglas (5) || Conseco Fieldhouse  8,514
|-
| rowspan=2|Thu 8 || 8:00 || Chicago || @ || Minnesota || NBA TVCN100FS-N || 78-69MIN || Augustus (22) || Swords (8) || Whalen (10) || Target Center  8,781
|-
| 10:00 || Tulsa || @ || Phoenix || NBA TVCOX || 91-76PHO || Cambage (22) || BonnerJackson (10) || Swanier (9) || US Airways Center  8,189
|-
| rowspan=3|Fri 9 || 7:00 || Indiana || @ || New York || NBA TVMSG+ || 83-75NYL || Carson (18) || Vaughn (9) || Bobbitt (7) || Prudential Center  8,015
|-
| 10:00 || Phoenix || @ || Seattle || KONG || 85-70SEA || Taurasi (36) || BonnerCash (14) || Bird (6) || KeyArena  9,686
|-
| 10:30 || Tulsa || @ || Los Angeles || NBA TV || 84-73LAS || Lavender (19) || Lavender (12) || Penicheiro (7) || Staples Center  10,299
|-
| rowspan=2|Sat 10 || 8:00 || Washington || @ || San Antonio || NBA TV || 82-74SAN || Young (17) || AnosikeLanghorne (9) || Hammon (11) || AT&T Center  12,813
|-
| 10:30 || Chicago || @ || Los Angeles || NBA TVCN100 || 74-67LAS || Fowles (18) || Fowles (11) || Lacy (7) || Staples Center  13,501
|-
| rowspan=5|Sun 11 || 1:00 || New York || @ || Connecticut || NBA TV || 69-63CON || Charles (18) || CharlesJones (11) || Pondexter (5) || Mohegan Sun Arena  9,115
|-
| 5:00 || Atlanta || @ || Indiana || NBA TVSSOFS-I || 93-88ATL || McCoughtry (32) || Bales (11) || Bobbitt (6) || Conseco Fieldhouse  11,521
|-
| 6:00 || Minnesota || @ || Phoenix || FS-A || 96-90MIN || Taurasi (19) || Adair (13) || Wright (6) || US Airways Center  12,666
|-
| 7:00 || San Antonio || @ || Tulsa || NBA TVFS-SW || 102-94 (OT)SAN || D. Robinson (36) || Jackson (9) || Holt (7) || BOK Center  5,949
|-
| 9:00 || Chicago || @ || Seattle || NBA TVKONG || 81-70SEA || Fowles (30) || Fowles (13) || Thorn (7) || KeyArena  13,659

|-
! style="background:#094480; color:white" | 2011 WNBA postseason
|-

|-
| rowspan=2|Thu 15 || 8:00 || New York || @ || Indiana || ESPN2 || 74-72IND || Douglas (25) || Powell (8) || Pondexter (6) || Conseco Fieldhouse  7,608
|- 
| 10:00 || Phoenix || @ || Seattle || ESPN2 || 80-61SEA || Wright (21) || CashLittle (11) || Little (4) || KeyArena  7,279
|-
| rowspan=2|Fri 16 || 7:00 || Atlanta || @ || Connecticut || NBA TV || 89-84ATL || Harding (21) || Lyttle (11) || Harding (5) || Mohegan Sun Arena  7,373
|- 
| 10:00 || San Antonio || @ || Minnesota || NBA TV || 66-65MIN || Whalen (20) || Brunson (14) || Young (6) || Target Center  11,891
|-
| rowspan=2|Sat 17 || 4:00 || Indiana || @ || New York || NBA TVMSG || 87-72NYL || Douglas (20) || Catchings (9) || Pondexter (5) || Prudential Center  8,508
|- 
| 10:00 || Seattle || @ || Phoenix || NBA TV || 92-83PHO || Dupree (29) || Dupree (13) || Johnson (9) || US Airways Center  9,356
|-
| rowspan=2|Sun 18 || 3:00 || Connecticut || @ || Atlanta || ESPN2 || 69-64ATL || Jones (15) || Charles (17) || HardingMontgomery (6) || Philips Arena  6,887
|- 
| 5:00 || Minnesota || @ || San Antonio || ESPN2 || 84-75SAN || AugustusPerkins (24) || Brunson (16) || Hammon (6) || AT&T Center  7,023
|-
| rowspan=2|Mon 19 || 8:00 || New York || @ || Indiana || ESPN2 || 72-62IND || Douglas (21) || Catchings (8) || Pondexter (5) || Conseco Fieldhouse  7,368
|- 
| 10:00 || Phoenix || @ || Seattle || ESPN2 || 77-75PHO || Bird (22) || Taylor (17) || SmithWright (4) || KeyArena  8,589
|-
| rowspan=1|Tue 20 || 8:00 || San Antonio || @ || Minnesota || ESPN2 || 85-67MIN || Augustus (22) || Brunson (9) || Hammon (5) || Target Center  8,734

|-
| rowspan=2|Thu 22 || 7:00 || Atlanta || @ || Indiana || ESPN2 || 82–74IND || Smith (25) || Catchingsde Souza (13) || Harding (7) || Conseco Fieldhouse  8,253
|- 
| 9:00 || Phoenix || @ || Minnesota || ESPN2 || 95–67MIN || Taurasi (22) || Brunson (13) || Augustus (7) || Target Center  8,912
|-
| rowspan=2|Sun 25 || 3:00 || Indiana || @ || Atlanta || ESPN2 || 94-77ATL || Castro Marques (30) || Catchings (9) || Harding (7) || Philips Arena  8,052
|- 
| 5:00 || Minnesota || @ || Phoenix || ESPN2 || 103-86MIN || BonnerTaurasi (22) || Dupree (11) || McWilliams-Franklin (7) || US Airways Center  8,617
|-
| rowspan=1|Tue 27 || 8:00 || Atlanta || @ || Indiana || ESPN2 || 83-67ATL || McCoughtry (26) || Lyttle (11) || Harding (6) || Conseco Fieldhouse  9,036
|-

|-
| rowspan=1|Sun 2 || 8:30 || Atlanta || @ || Minnesota || ESPN || 88–74MIN || McCoughtry (33) || Brunson (11) || Augustus (7) || Target Center 15,258 
|-
| rowspan=1|Wed 5 || 8:00 || Atlanta || @ || Minnesota || ESPN2 || 101–95MIN || McCoughtry (38) || de Souza (10) || Harding (7) || Target Center  15,124
|-
| rowspan=1|Fri 7 || 8:00 || Minnesota || @ || Atlanta || ESPN2 || 73–67MIN || McCoughtry (22) || de Souza (15) || Harding (7) || Philips Arena  11,543
|-

Playoffs and Finals

Season award winners

Player of the Week award

Player of the Month award

Rookie of the Month award

Postseason awards

Coaches

Eastern Conference
Atlanta Dream: Marynell Meadors 
Chicago Sky: Pokey Chatman
Connecticut Sun: Mike Thibault
Indiana Fever: Lin Dunn
New York Liberty: John Whisenant
Washington Mystics: Trudi Lacey

Western Conference
Los Angeles Sparks: Jennifer Gillom and Joe Bryant
Minnesota Lynx: Cheryl Reeve
Phoenix Mercury: Corey Gaines 
San Antonio Silver Stars: Dan Hughes
Seattle Storm: Brian Agler
Tulsa Shock: Nolan Richardson and Teresa Edwards

See also
WNBA
WNBA Draft
WNBA All-Star Game
WNBA Playoffs
WNBA Finals

References

External links
Official Site

 
2011 in American women's basketball
2010–11 in American basketball by league
2011–12 in American basketball by league
Women's National Basketball Association seasons